The women's field hockey tournament at the 1995 Pan American Games was the 3rd edition of the field hockey event for women at the Pan American Games. It was held over a thirteen-day period beginning on 12 July, and culminating with the medal finals on 25 July. All games were played at the Sintético De Agua in Mar del Plata, Argentina.

Argentina won the gold medal for the third time after defeating the United States 3–2 in the final. Canada won the bronze medal by defeating Cuba 4–0.

The tournament served as the Pan American qualifier for the 1996 Summer Olympics in Atlanta, United States.

Teams
Including the host nation, who received an automatic berth, seven teams participated in the tournament.

Results
All times are local (ART).

Preliminary round

Fixtures

Classification matches

Bronze-medal match

Gold-medal match

Final rankings

Goalscorers

References

External links
LA84 Foundation Digital Library
Pan American Hockey Federation

Women's tournament
Pan American Games
1995
1995 Pan American Games